Katri "Kaisa" Vellamo Parviainen (3 December 1914 – 21 October 2002) was a Finnish athlete. She competed in the javelin throw at the 1948 and 1952 Olympics and won a silver medal in 1948, finishing 16th in 1952; in 1948 she also placed 13th in the long jump.

References

1914 births
2002 deaths
People from Juankoski
People from Kuopio Province (Grand Duchy of Finland)
Finnish female javelin throwers
Olympic athletes of Finland
Athletes (track and field) at the 1948 Summer Olympics
Athletes (track and field) at the 1952 Summer Olympics
Olympic silver medalists for Finland
Medalists at the 1948 Summer Olympics
Olympic silver medalists in athletics (track and field)
Sportspeople from North Savo